Richard Bishop may refer to:

Richard M. Bishop (1812–1893), American politician
Richard Bishop (gridiron football) (1950–2016), American football defensive tackle
Richard Bishop (guitarist), American guitarist, member of Sun City Girls
Richard Bishop (gymnast) (1910–1996), American Olympic gymnast
Richard Bishop (MP), Member of Parliament (MP) for Hastings
Richard Bishop (painter) (1887–1975), American painter
Richard L. Bishop (1931–2019), American mathematician
Richard Evelyn Donohue Bishop (1925–1989), British physicist and FRS